Casey Raymond Alexander (born September 12, 1975) is an American cartoonist, animator, storyboard artist, writer, director, and producer known for his work on SpongeBob SquarePants, Uncle Grandpa, Billy Dilley's Super-Duper Subterranean Summer, and The SpongeBob SquarePants Movie.

Career
Alexander started working at Nickelodeon on The SpongeBob SquarePants Movie as a layout artist. In 2005, he started working as a storyboard director and writer for SpongeBob SquarePants until 2012, when he left to work at Cartoon Network as a creative director on Uncle Grandpa. During his time on Uncle Grandpa, he wrote for the Cartoon Network short Jammers, and came back to Nickelodeon to write and direct for the Sanjay and Craig episode "Dream Rangers". After Uncle Grandpa ended, Alexander started working as a writer and storyboard director for Billy Dilley's Super-Duper Subterranean Summer, and a director for Unikitty!. As of 2019, he is a supervising producer on Victor and Valentino.

Filmography

Film

Television

References

External links

American male screenwriters
American animators
American storyboard artists
American television writers
American voice directors
Living people
American male television writers
1975 births
People from San Luis Obispo County, California
Screenwriters from California
21st-century American screenwriters
21st-century American male writers